"Look at Her" is a song by R&B group One Chance. It was released as a single on July 26, 2006 by J Records. It features Fabo of the rap group D4L. It was produced by Soundz, a producer based in Milwaukee and Atlanta.

Track listing
"Look at Her" (Radio Edit)
"Look at Her" (Soundz Remix)
"Look at Her" (featuring Lloyd, Bobby Valentino, and Trey Songz)

Music video

The video shows the group getting ready for and performing a show at Mosley Park in Atlanta (with several girls getting excited in the process). US Records labelmate Rico Love makes a cameo appearance in the video.

Usher introduces the group as a radio presenter. Fabo made appearances dancing like he does in the "Laffy Taffy" video. Ciara appears in the video as well.

Remixes
The rap remix features labelmate Rico Love, and is basically the same song with an additional verse by Rico at the beginning. The R&B remix features Lloyd, Bobby Valentino, and Trey Songz, and has an entirely different beat and lyrics.

Chart performance
The song peaked at number 53 on Billboard's Hot R&B/Hip-Hop Songs chart.

References

2006 singles
2006 songs
J Records singles
Snap songs